Penicillium hypomycetis is a species of the genus of Penicillium.

References

hypomycetis
Fungi described in 1886